The 2008 CONCACAF Women's Olympic Qualifying Tournament was the 2nd edition of the CONCACAF Women's Olympic Qualifying Tournament, the quadrennial international football tournament organised by CONCACAF to determine which two women's national teams from the North, Central American and Caribbean region qualify for the Olympic football tournament.   A total of six teams played in the tournament.
The top two teams of the tournament - United States and Canada - qualified for the 2008 Summer Olympics women's football tournament in Beijing, China as the CONCACAF representatives.

Qualification

The six berths were allocated to the three regional zones as follows:
Three teams from the North American Zone (NAFU), i.e., Canada, the hosts Mexico, and the United States, who all qualified automatically
One team from the Central American Zone (UNCAF)
Two teams from the Caribbean Zone (CFU)

Regional qualification tournaments were held to determine the three teams joining Canada, Mexico, and the United States at the final tournament.

Qualified teams
The following six teams qualified for the final tournament.

Venues
The sole venue was the Estadio Olímpico Benito Juárez, Ciudad Juarez, Mexico.

Draw
The six teams were drawn into two groups of three teams. Defending CONCACAF Olympic Qualifying Championship champion and 2004 Olympic gold medalist United States were seeded in Group A.

Squads

Group stage
The top two teams of each group advance to the semi-finals.

All times are local, CST (UTC−6).

Group A

Group B

Knockout stage
In the knockout stage, if a match is level at the end of regular time (two periods of 45 minutes), extra time is played (two periods of 15 minutes) and followed, if necessary, by a penalty shoot-out to determine the winner. In the case of the third place match, as it is played just before the final, extra time is skipped and a penalty shoot-out takes place.

Bracket

Semi-finals
Winners qualify for 2008 Summer Olympics.

Third place play-off

Final

Goalscorers
4 goals

 Natasha Kai
 Juana López
 Melissa Tancredi

3 goals

 Abby Wambach

2 goals

 Carli Lloyd
 Tania Morales
 Heather O'Reilly
 Teresa Worbis

1 goal

 Jonelle Filigno
 Randee Hermus
 Kara Lang
 Jodi Ann Robinson
 Christine Sinclair
 Cristin Granados
 Amara Wilson
 Omolyn Davis
 María Gordillo
 Mónica Ocampo
 Kennya Cordner
 Maylee Attin-Johnson
 Lauren Cheney
 Tobin Heath

References

 https://web.archive.org/web/20160713230217/http://www.concacaf.com/article/womens-olympic-qualifying-2008-recap

External links
Olympic Qualifying – Women, CONCACAF.com
, CONCACAF.com

 
2008
Olympic Qualifying Championship, Women's
Concacaf Women's Olympic Qualifying Championship
Concacaf
Olympic Qualifying Championship, Women's
2008 CONCACAF Women's Olympic Qualifying Championship